Kempaiah IPS is a police officer from Karnataka, India. The high point of his career was successfully hunting down Rajiv Gandhi's assassins in Bengaluru.

He led the Karnataka police team that tracked Sivarasan, prime accused in the Rajiv Gandhi murder case, to his hideout in Konanakunte outside Bengaluru. However, Sivarasan killed himself before he could be captured. Kempaiah is one of the few living people from Karnataka who has had a movie made about his life. Kempaiah IPS Kannada movie features Shashi Kumar as the hero.

Kempaiah has left his indelible mark of service in Mysuru District. He turned out to be a renaissance man of the Police Department, having restored almost all the dilapidated Police Stations without sacrificing the heritage character of the buildings. Until Kempaiah came to Mysuru, the Police Commissioner did not have an office of his own and was functioning from temporary premises on Lalitha Mahal Palace Road, in the office of the KSRP.

When Kempaiah was in charge of the STF, he made sandalwood smuggler and forest brigand Veerappan run for shelter in M M Hills; Kempaiah was about to catch Veerappan but by that time the State Government transferred Kempaiah. Immediately after, Veerappan resurfaced from his hideout and took Nagappa, Ex-Minister of Karnataka hostage. During his tenure as STF Chief, Kempaiah maintained a wonderful relationship with his Tamil Nadu counterparts like Walter Dewaram IPS and Vijayakumar IPS. In fact, in her interview with the BBC the then TN Chief Minister Jayalalitha praised Kempaiah for his good co-ordination and exchange of intelligence with TN STF.

He handled many sensational cases including bringing culprits like Shradhananda to book for murdering his wife Shakereh Khaleeli.

He was very close to Rajkumar, the Kannada matinée Idol. Dr Raj preferred Kempaiah for his police costumes in films.

Suraksha Academy 
Since his retirement Kempaiah has been working on starting a training academy for security personnel. He is working full-time to establish his dream project called "Suraksha Foundation" in his farm just off Bengaluru on Kanakapura Road.

References
Article
Movie
The men who'll chase Veerappan
Ourkarnataka

People from Mysore district
Karnataka Police
Indian Police Service officers